The 1997 Open Championship was a men's major golf championship and the 126th Open Championship, held from 17–20 July at the Royal Troon Golf Club in Troon, Scotland. Justin Leonard won his only major championship and was the fifth consecutive American to win at Royal Troon.

Five strokes back after a 72 in the third round, Leonard had six birdies on the front nine in the final round; he added two more at 16 and 17 for 65 (–6) to win by three strokes over runners-up Darren Clarke and Jesper Parnevik, the 54-hole leader.

Course

Old Course 

Lengths of the course for previous Opens (since 1950):

Opens from 1962 through 1989 played the 11th hole as a par-5.

Past champions in the field

Made the cut

Source:

Missed the cut

Source:

Round summaries

First round
Thursday, 17 July 1997

Source:

Second round
Friday, 18 July 1997

Source:
Amateurs: Howard (+2), Watson (+7), Bladon (+10), Olsson (+11), Webster (+11), Taylor (+15), Young (+17), Miller (+22).

Third round
Saturday, 19 July 1997

Source:

Final round
Sunday, 20 July 1997

Source:
Amateurs: Howard (+9)

Scorecard

Cumulative tournament scores, relative to par

Source:

References

External links
Royal Troon 1997 (Official site)
126th Open Championship - Royal Troon (European Tour)

The Open Championship
Golf tournaments in Scotland
Open Championship
Open Championship
Open Championship